Ortho-DOT, or 4,5-dimethoxy-2-methylthioamphetamine, is a lesser-known psychedelic drug. Ortho-DOT was first synthesized by Alexander Shulgin. In his book PiHKAL (Phenethylamines i Have Known And Loved), neither the dosage nor the duration are known. Ortho-DOT produces few to no effects. Very little data exists about the pharmacological properties, metabolism, and toxicity of Ortho-DOT.

See also 
 Meta-DOT
 Phenethylamine
 Psychedelics, dissociatives and deliriants

References 

Substituted amphetamines
Phenol ethers
Thioethers